Denys Charitonowitsch Panasyuk (Ukrainian - Денис Харитонович Панасюк; 5 (17) May 1900, Hanschyna – 8 June 1984, Kiev) was a Ukrainian Soviet lawyer and politician. He was a deputy of the 35th convocation of the Supreme Soviet of the USSR and a member of the Central Committee of the Communist Party from 1954 to 1966. From 1947 to 1953 he was Minister of Justice for the Ukrainian Soviet Socialist Republic and from August 1953 to February 1963 its prosecutor general (at that time subordinate to the Prosecutor General of the Soviet Union).

References

1900 births
1984 deaths
Burials at Baikove Cemetery
People from Vinnytsia Oblast
People from Bratslavsky Uyezd
Central Committee of the Communist Party of Ukraine (Soviet Union) members
Prosecutors of the Ukrainian Soviet Socialist Republic
Third convocation members of the Verkhovna Rada of the Ukrainian Soviet Socialist Republic
Fourth convocation members of the Verkhovna Rada of the Ukrainian Soviet Socialist Republic
Fifth convocation members of the Verkhovna Rada of the Ukrainian Soviet Socialist Republic